The Union of Messianic Jewish Congregations (UMJC) is an international Messianic Jewish organization which supports Messianic Jewish  congregations.

History 
It was founded in 1979 by a group of 19 congregations in Mechanicsburg, Pennsylvania. , it has 75 congregations in 8 countries.

References

External links 
 The Union of Messianic Jewish Congregations

Christian organizations established in 1979
Christian denominations established in the 20th century